The 1871 New Zealand general election was held between 14 January and 23 February to elect 78 MPs across 72 electorates to the fifth session of the New Zealand Parliament. 41,527 electors were registered.

Background
1871 was the first general election to include the four Māori electorates, with elections held on 1 and 15 February. The first Māori Members of Parliament had been elected in 1868, but in 1871 three retired and one (Western Maori) was defeated. So in 1871 four new Māori MPs were elected.

In 1866 the secret ballot was introduced for general (European) elections. The 1871 general election was the first one at which it was used. The secret ballot not used in Māori electorates until 1938, thus Māori voters continued to inform a polling officer orally of their chosen candidate.

The date of election is defined here as the day on which the poll took place, or if there was no contest, the day of nomination. The earliest election day was 14 January 1871. The earliest date in the general electorate results table, 13 January 1871, thus represents William Rolleston being declared elected unopposed in the Avon electorate on nomination day. The last election was held on 23 February 1871 in the Franklin electorate.

68 European electorates and 4 Māori electorates were defined by the Representation Act 1870. Six of the general electorates had two representatives, the rest were single member electorates. Hence, 78 MPs were elected.

Results

a Unseated on petition.

Notes

References